The Rzeszów–Khmelnytskyi powerline is an electrical power transmission line between Ukraine and Poland. It is the only 750 kV-powerline in Poland and one of the few of it in the European Union of this type.

History
The decision to build this powerline was made in 1977 and it went in operation in 1985.  The line went out of service after Poland joined the synchronous grid of Continental Europe (UCTE).  However, there was a plan to re-activate this line after 2010 by constructing a back-to-back conversion station on the Polish end of the line, but this was not implemented.

In 2016 Energoatom announced it was considering disconnecting unit 2 of the Khmelnytskyi Nuclear Power Plant from the Ukrainian power grid and using the powerline to connect to the Burshtyn TES energy island which operates on the European power grid, to facilitate exports to Poland and Hungary.  In 2019 the Ministry of Energy created a consortium, Ukraine Power Bridge Company Limited, to progress the project, but as of 2020 the project was not agreed.

Technical description
It runs from Widełka substation near Rzeszów in Poland to Khmelnytskyi Nuclear Power Plant in Ukraine. It is an AC line and has a single circuit. It can transfer a maximum power of 1300 MVA.

As guyed portal pylons are used, strainers are from special design. They consist of three free-standing lattice towers each carrying one conductor. Each strainer tower has a crossbar at which the conductor is led around the structure on a huge insulator.

The line crosses at  the 750 kV powerline from Zakhidnoukrainska Substation to Rivne Nuclear Power Plant, which may be the only crossing of two 750 kV powerlines in Europe.

See also
 Albertirsa–Zakhidnoukrainska–Vinnytsia powerline
 Vetrino–Isaccea–Yuzhnoukrainsk powerline

References

Energy infrastructure completed in 1985
High-voltage transmission lines
Electric power infrastructure in Poland
Electric power transmission systems in Ukraine
1985 establishments in Poland
1985 establishments in Ukraine